Pardon Me Boys were a short lived Australian swing jazz-cabaret band. The group released one studio album which peaked at number 63 on the Australian charts in 1988.

Discography

Albums

Singles

References

Australian pop music groups
Musical groups established in 1985
Musical groups disestablished in 1988